Sold for a Smile is the third and final album by Canadian rock band The Gandharvas. It was released in 1997 in Canada on the Watch Music record label, and in 1998 internationally on MCA Records. By April 1998, the album had sold 21,000 units in Canada. The 1998 MCA release includes a cover version of Cyndi Lauper's song "Time After Time" and a re-recorded version of The Gandharvas' 1994 hit "The First Day of Spring".

Singles
The album's lead single, "Downtime", was a hit in Canada, peaking at #8 on Canada's Alternative chart. "Downtime" is also the band's only single to chart in the United States, peaking at #34 on the Billboard Active Rock chart in 1998. "Watching the Girl" was released as the second single from the album.

Track listing 
All songs written by the Gandharvas.
"Downtime" – 4:06
"Gonna Be So Loose" – 3:41
"Shells" – 2:06
"Waiting for Something to Happen/Reprise" – 6:01
"Hammer in a Shell" – 3:06
"Watching the Girl" – 3:13
"Sarsaparilla" – 4:16
"Into the Mainstream" – 4:26
"Milk Ocean" – 4:08
"Diaboloney" – 3:10

Personnel 
Paul Jago – vocals
Tim McDonald – drums
Jud Ruhl – guitar
Brian Ward – guitar
Beau Cook – bass, keyboards
Laurence Currie – producer, engineer, mixing
George Graves – mastering
Ross Munro – executive producer
Jason Darbyson – design, illustration
Mike Richardson – design, illustration
Richard Sibbald – photography

References

1997 albums
The Gandharvas albums